Vermont was admitted to the Union on March 4, 1791. From the 1850s until well into the 20th century, Vermont was always represented by members of the Republican Party. Democrat Patrick Leahy (served 1975–2023) is the longest serving senator. Its current United States senators are Independent Bernie Sanders (since 2007) and Democrat Peter Welch (since 2023). Coincidentally, they both previously held the state's only house district.

List of senators

|- style="height:2em"
| colspan=3 | Vacant
| nowrap | Mar 4, 1791 –Oct 17, 1791
| Vermont elected its senators several months after statehood.
| rowspan=6 | 1
| rowspan=2 
| rowspan=3 | 1
| Vermont elected its senators several months after statehood.
| nowrap | Mar 4, 1791 –Oct 17, 1791
| colspan=3 | Vacant

|- style="height:2em"
! rowspan=3 | 1
| rowspan=3 align=left | Moses Robinson
| rowspan=2  | Anti-Admin.
| rowspan=3 nowrap | Oct 17, 1791 –Oct 15, 1796
| rowspan=3 | Elected in 1791.Resigned.
| rowspan=2 | Elected in 1791.Lost re-election.
| rowspan=2 nowrap | Oct 17, 1791 –Mar 3, 1795
| rowspan=2  | Anti-Admin.
| rowspan=2 align=right | Stephen R. Bradley
! rowspan=2 | 1

|- style="height:2em"
| 

|- style="height:2em"
|  | Democratic-Republican
| rowspan=3 
| rowspan=6 | 2
| rowspan=6 | Elected in 1794.
| rowspan=7 nowrap | Mar 4, 1795 –Sep 1, 1801
| rowspan=7  | Federalist
| rowspan=7 align=right | Elijah Paine
! rowspan=7 | 2

|- style="height:2em"
| colspan=3 | Vacant
| nowrap | Oct 15, 1796 –Oct 18, 1796
|  

|- style="height:2em"
! rowspan=2 | 2
| rowspan=2 align=left | Isaac Tichenor
| rowspan=2  | Federalist
| rowspan=2 nowrap | Oct 18, 1796 –Oct 17, 1797
| Elected in 1796 to finish Robinson's term.

|- style="height:2em"
| Elected in 1796 to full term.Resigned to become Governor of Vermont.
| rowspan=6 | 2
| rowspan=2 

|- style="height:2em"
! rowspan=5 | 3
| rowspan=5 align=left |  Nathaniel Chipman
| rowspan=5  | Federalist
| rowspan=5 nowrap | Oct 17, 1797 –Mar 3, 1803
| rowspan=5 | Elected in 1797 to finish Tichenor's term.Lost re-election.

|- style="height:2em"
| 

|- style="height:2em"
| rowspan=3 
| rowspan=5 | 3
| Re-elected in 1800.Resigned.

|- style="height:2em"
|  
| nowrap | Sep 1, 1801 –Oct 15, 1801
| colspan=3 | Vacant

|- style="height:2em"
| rowspan=3 | Elected to finish Paine's term.
| rowspan=8 nowrap | Oct 15, 1801 –Mar 3, 1813
| rowspan=8  | Democratic-Republican
| rowspan=8 align=right | Stephen R. Bradley
! rowspan=8 | 3

|- style="height:2em"
! rowspan=3 | 4
| rowspan=3 align=left | Israel Smith
| rowspan=3  | Democratic-Republican
| rowspan=3 nowrap | Mar 4, 1803 –Oct 1, 1807
| rowspan=3 | Elected in 1802.Resigned.
| rowspan=5 | 3
| 

|- style="height:2em"
| 

|- style="height:2em"
| rowspan=3 
| rowspan=5 | 4
| rowspan=5 | Re-elected in 1806.Retired.

|- style="height:2em"
| colspan=3 | Vacant
| nowrap | Oct 1, 1807 –Oct 10, 1807
|  

|- style="height:2em"
! rowspan=4 | 5
| rowspan=4 align=left | Jonathan Robinson
| rowspan=4  | Democratic-Republican
| rowspan=4 nowrap | Oct 10, 1807 –Mar 3, 1815
| Elected to finish Smith's term.

|- style="height:2em"
| rowspan=3 | Re-elected in 1808.Retired.
| rowspan=3 | 4
| 

|- style="height:2em"
| 

|- style="height:2em"
| 
| rowspan=6 | 5
| rowspan=3 | Elected in 1812.Resigned.
| rowspan=3 nowrap | Mar 4, 1813 –Nov 3, 1817
| rowspan=3  | Democratic-Republican
| rowspan=3 align=right | Dudley Chase
! rowspan=3 | 4

|- style="height:2em"
! rowspan=6 | 6
| rowspan=6 align=left | Isaac Tichenor
| rowspan=6  | Federalist
| rowspan=6 nowrap | Mar 4, 1815 –Mar 3, 1821
| rowspan=6 | Elected in 1814.Retired.
| rowspan=6 | 5
| 

|- style="height:2em"
| rowspan=4 

|- style="height:2em"
| Elected to finish Chase's term.Resigned to serve as collector of customs for the district of Vermont.
| nowrap | Nov 4, 1817 –Jan 8, 1818
|  | Democratic-Republican
| align=right | James Fisk
! 5

|- style="height:2em"
|  
| nowrap | Jan 8, 1818 –Oct 20, 1818
| colspan=3 | Vacant

|- style="height:2em"
| Elected to finish Fisk's term.
| rowspan=4 nowrap | Oct 20, 1818 –Mar 3, 1825
| rowspan=4  | Democratic-Republican
| rowspan=4 align=right | William A. Palmer
! rowspan=4 | 6

|- style="height:2em"
| 
| rowspan=3 | 6
| rowspan=3 | Elected in 1818 to the following term.Retired.

|- style="height:2em"
! rowspan=6 | 7
| rowspan=6 align=left | Horatio Seymour
| rowspan=2  | Democratic-Republican
| rowspan=6 nowrap | Mar 4, 1821 –Mar 3, 1833
| rowspan=3 | Elected in 1821.
| rowspan=3 | 6
| 

|- style="height:2em"
| 

|- style="height:2em"
| rowspan=4  | NationalRepublican
| 
| rowspan=3 | 7
| rowspan=3 | Elected in 1825.Declined to run for reelection.
| rowspan=3 nowrap | Mar 4, 1825 –Mar 3, 1831
| rowspan=3  | NationalRepublican
| rowspan=3 align=right | Dudley Chase
! rowspan=3 | 7

|- style="height:2em"
| rowspan=3 | Re-elected in 1827.Retired to run for Governor of Vermont;
| rowspan=3 | 7
| 

|- style="height:2em"
| 

|- style="height:2em"
| 
| rowspan=3 | 8
| rowspan=3 | Elected in 1831.
| rowspan=6 nowrap | Mar 4, 1831 –Apr 11, 1842
| rowspan=3  | NationalRepublican
| rowspan=6 align=right | Samuel Prentiss
! rowspan=6 | 8

|- style="height:2em"
! rowspan=3 | 8
| rowspan=3 align=left | Benjamin Swift
| rowspan=2  | NationalRepublican
| rowspan=3 nowrap | Mar 4, 1833 –Mar 3, 1839
| rowspan=3 | Elected in 1833.Retired.
| rowspan=3 | 8
| 

|- style="height:2em"
| 

|- style="height:2em"
|  | Whig
| 
| rowspan=5 | 9
| rowspan=3 | Re-elected in 1837.Resigned.
| rowspan=3  | Whig

|- style="height:2em"
! rowspan=8 | 9
| rowspan=8 align=left | Samuel S. Phelps
| rowspan=8  | Whig
| rowspan=8 nowrap | Mar 4, 1839 –Mar 3, 1851
| rowspan=5 | Elected in 1839.
| rowspan=5 | 9
| 

|- style="height:2em"
| rowspan=3 

|- style="height:2em"
|  
| nowrap | Apr 11, 1842 –Apr 23, 1842
| colspan=3 | Vacant

|- style="height:2em"
| Appointed to continue Prentiss's term.Elected in 1842 to finish Prentiss's term.Retired.
| nowrap | Apr 23, 1842 –Mar 3, 1843
|  | Whig
| align=right | Samuel C. Crafts
! 9

|- style="height:2em"
| 
| rowspan=3 | 10
| rowspan=3 | Elected in 1843.
| rowspan=5 nowrap | Mar 4, 1843 –Jan 14, 1853
| rowspan=5  | Whig
| rowspan=5 align=right | William Upham
! rowspan=5 | 10

|- style="height:2em"
| rowspan=3 | Re-elected in 1845.Lost re-election.
| rowspan=3 | 10
| 

|- style="height:2em"
| 

|- style="height:2em"
| 
| rowspan=7 | 11
| rowspan=2 | Re-elected in 1848.Died.

|- style="height:2em"
! rowspan=14 | 10
| rowspan=14 align=left | Solomon Foot
| rowspan=6  | Whig
| rowspan=14 nowrap | Mar 4, 1851 –Mar 28, 1866
| rowspan=7 | Elected in 1850.
| rowspan=7 | 11
| rowspan=3 

|- style="height:2em"
|  
| nowrap | Jan 14, 1853 –Jan 17, 1853
| colspan=3 | Vacant

|- style="height:2em"
| rowspan=2 | Appointed to continue Upham's term.Lost entitlement to sit.
| rowspan=2 nowrap | Jan 17, 1853 –Mar 16, 1854
| rowspan=2  | Whig
| rowspan=2 align=right | Samuel S. Phelps
! rowspan=2 | 11

|- style="height:2em"
| rowspan=3 

|- style="height:2em"
|  
| nowrap | Mar 16, 1854 –Oct 14, 1854
| colspan=3 | Vacant

|- style="height:2em"
| Elected to finish Upham's term.Retired.
| nowrap | Oct 14, 1854 –Mar 3, 1855
|  | Free Soil
| align=right | Lawrence Brainerd
! 12

|- style="height:2em"
| rowspan=8  | Republican
| 
| rowspan=3 | 12
| rowspan=3 | Elected in 1855.
| rowspan=6 nowrap | Mar 4, 1855 –Nov 9, 1865
| rowspan=6  | Republican
| rowspan=6 align=right | Jacob Collamer
! rowspan=6 | 13

|- style="height:2em"
| rowspan=3 | Re-elected in 1856.
| rowspan=3 | 12
| 

|- style="height:2em"
| 

|- style="height:2em"
| 
| rowspan=7 | 13
| rowspan=3 | Re-elected in 1861.Died.

|- style="height:2em"
| rowspan=4 | Re-elected in 1862.Died.
| rowspan=7 | 13
| 

|- style="height:2em"
| rowspan=5 

|- style="height:2em"
|  
| nowrap | Nov 9, 1865 –Nov 21, 1865
| colspan=3 | Vacant

|- style="height:2em"
| rowspan=3 | Appointed to continue Collamer's term.Elected in 1866 to finish Collamer's term.Lost re-election.
| rowspan=3 nowrap | Nov 21, 1865 –Mar 3, 1867
| rowspan=3  | Republican
| rowspan=3 align=right | Luke P. Poland
! rowspan=3 | 14

|- style="height:2em"
| colspan=3 | Vacant
| nowrap | Mar 28, 1866 –Apr 3, 1866
|  

|- style="height:2em"
! rowspan=14 | 11
| rowspan=14 align=left | George F. Edmunds
| rowspan=14  | Republican
| rowspan=14 nowrap | Apr 3, 1866 –Nov 1, 1891
| rowspan=2 | Appointed to continue Foot's term.Elected in 1866 to finish Foot's term.

|- style="height:2em"
| 
| rowspan=3 | 14
| rowspan=3 | Elected in 1866.
| rowspan=17 nowrap | Mar 4, 1867 – Dec 28, 1898
| rowspan=17  | Republican
| rowspan=17 align=right | Justin S. Morrill
! rowspan=17 | 15

|- style="height:2em"
| rowspan=3 | Re-elected in 1868.
| rowspan=3 | 14
| 

|- style="height:2em"
| 

|- style="height:2em"
| 
| rowspan=3 | 15
| rowspan=3 | Re-elected in 1872.

|- style="height:2em"
| rowspan=3 | Re-elected in 1874.
| rowspan=3 | 15
| 

|- style="height:2em"
| 

|- style="height:2em"
| 
| rowspan=3 | 16
| rowspan=3 | Re-elected in 1878.

|- style="height:2em"
| rowspan=3 | Re-elected in 1880.
| rowspan=3 | 16
| 

|- style="height:2em"
| 

|- style="height:2em"
| 
| rowspan=3 | 17
| rowspan=3 | Re-elected in 1884.

|- style="height:2em"
| rowspan=3 | Re-elected in 1886.Resigned to start a law practice.
| rowspan=4 | 17
| 

|- style="height:2em"
| 

|- style="height:2em"
| rowspan=2 
| rowspan=4 | 18
| rowspan=4 | Re-elected in 1890.

|- style="height:2em"
! rowspan=12 | 12
| rowspan=12 align=left | Redfield Proctor
| rowspan=12  | Republican
| rowspan=12 nowrap | Nov 2, 1891 –Mar 4, 1908
| Appointed to continue Edmunds's term.Elected in 1892 to finish Edmunds's term.

|- style="height:2em"
| rowspan=5 | Re-elected in 1892.
| rowspan=5 | 18
| 

|- style="height:2em"
| 

|- style="height:2em"
| rowspan=3 
| rowspan=6 | 19
| Re-elected in 1896.Died.

|- style="height:2em"
|  
| nowrap | Dec 28, 1898 –Jan 11, 1899
| colspan=3 | Vacant

|- style="height:2em"
| rowspan=2 | Appointed to continue Morrill's term.Retired when successor elected.
| rowspan=2 nowrap | Jan 11, 1899 –Oct 18, 1900
| rowspan=2  | Republican
| rowspan=2 align=right | Jonathan Ross
! rowspan=2 | 16

|- style="height:2em"
| rowspan=4 | Re-elected in 1898.
| rowspan=4 | 19
| rowspan=2 

|- style="height:2em"
| rowspan=2 | Elected to finish Morrill's term.
| rowspan=16 nowrap | Oct 18, 1900 –Jul 12, 1923
| rowspan=16  | Republican
| rowspan=16 align=right | William P. Dillingham
! rowspan=16 | 17

|- style="height:2em"
| 

|- style="height:2em"
| 
| rowspan=6 | 20
| rowspan=6 | Re-elected in 1902.

|- style="height:2em"
| rowspan=2 | Re-elected in 1904.Died.
| rowspan=6 | 20
| 

|- style="height:2em"
| rowspan=4 

|-
| colspan=3 | Vacant
| nowrap | Mar 4, 1908 –Mar 24, 1908
|  

|- style="height:2em"
! 13
| align=left | John W. Stewart
|  | Republican
| nowrap | Mar 24, 1908 –Oct 21, 1908
| Appointed to continue Proctor's term.Retired.

|- style="height:2em"
! rowspan=8 | 14
| rowspan=8 align=left | Carroll S. Page
| rowspan=8  | Republican
| rowspan=8 nowrap | Oct 21, 1908 –Mar 3, 1923
| rowspan=2 | Elected to finish Proctor's term.

|- style="height:2em"
| 
| rowspan=3 | 21
| rowspan=3 | Re-elected in 1908.

|- style="height:2em"
| rowspan=3 | Re-elected in 1910.
| rowspan=3 | 21
| 

|- style="height:2em"
| 

|- style="height:2em"
| 
| rowspan=3 | 22
| rowspan=3 | Re-elected in 1914.

|- style="height:2em"
| rowspan=3 | Re-elected in 1916.Retired.
| rowspan=3 | 22
| 

|- style="height:2em"
| 

|- style="height:2em"
| 
| rowspan=5 | 23
| rowspan=2 | Re-elected in 1920.Died.

|- style="height:2em"
! rowspan=6 | 15
| rowspan=6 align=left | Frank L. Greene
| rowspan=6  | Republican
| rowspan=6 nowrap | Mar 4, 1923 –Dec 17, 1930
| rowspan=5 | Elected in 1922.
| rowspan=5 | 23
| rowspan=3 

|- style="height:2em"
|  
| nowrap | Jul 12, 1923 –Nov 7, 1923
| colspan=3 | Vacant

|- style="height:2em"
| rowspan=2 | Elected to finish Dillingham's term.
| rowspan=9 nowrap | Nov 7, 1923 –Oct 6, 1933
| rowspan=9  | Republican
| rowspan=9 align=right | Porter H. Dale
! rowspan=9 | 18

|- style="height:2em"
| 

|- style="height:2em"
| 
| rowspan=6 | 24
| rowspan=6 | Re-elected in 1926.

|- style="height:2em"
| Re-elected in 1928.Died.
| rowspan=8 | 24
| rowspan=3 

|- style="height:2em"
| colspan=3 | Vacant
| nowrap | Dec 17, 1930 –Dec 23, 1930
|  

|- style="height:2em"
! rowspan=2 | 16
| rowspan=2 align=left | Frank C. Partridge
| rowspan=2  | Republican
| rowspan=2 nowrap | Dec 23, 1930 –Mar 31, 1931
| rowspan=2 | Appointed to continue Greene's term.Lost nomination to finish Greene's term.

|- style="height:2em"
| rowspan=2 

|- style="height:2em"
! rowspan=12 | 17
| rowspan=12 align=left | Warren Austin
| rowspan=12  | Republican
| rowspan=12 nowrap | Apr 1, 1931 –Aug 2, 1946
| rowspan=4 | Elected to finish Greene's term.

|- style="height:2em"
| rowspan=3 
| rowspan=5 | 25
| Re-elected in 1932.Died.

|- style="height:2em"
|  
| nowrap | Oct 6, 1933 –Nov 21, 1933
| colspan=3 | Vacant

|- style="height:2em"
| rowspan=3 | Appointed to continue Dale's term.Elected in 1934 to finish Dale's term.
| rowspan=4 nowrap | Nov 21, 1933 –Jun 20, 1940
| rowspan=4  | Republican
| rowspan=4 align=right | Ernest W. Gibson
! rowspan=4 | 19

|- style="height:2em"
| rowspan=5 | Re-elected in 1934.
| rowspan=5 | 25
| 

|- style="height:2em"
| 

|- style="height:2em"
| rowspan=3 
| rowspan=5 | 26
| Re-elected in 1938.Died.

|- style="height:2em"
|  
| nowrap | Jun 20, 1940 –Jun 24, 1940
| colspan=3 | Vacant

|- style="height:2em"
| Appointed to continue his father's term.Retired.
| nowrap | Jun 24, 1940 –Jan 3, 1941
|  | Republican
| align=right | Ernest W. Gibson Jr.
! 20

|- style="height:2em"
| rowspan=3 | Re-elected in 1940.Resigned to become U.S. Ambassador to the United Nations
| rowspan=5 | 26
| 
| rowspan=2 | Elected in 1940 to finish Gibson's term.Didn't take seat until Jan 10, 1941, in order to remain Governor of Vermont.
| rowspan=21 nowrap | Jan 3, 1941 –Jan 3, 1975
| rowspan=21  | Republican
| rowspan=21 align=right | George Aiken
! rowspan=21 | 21

|- style="height:2em"
| 

|- style="height:2em"
| rowspan=3 
| rowspan=5 | 27
| rowspan=5 | Re-elected in 1944.

|- style="height:2em"
| colspan=3 | Vacant
| nowrap | Aug 2, 1946 –Nov 1, 1946
|  

|- style="height:2em"
! rowspan=7 | 18
| rowspan=7 align=left | Ralph Flanders
| rowspan=7  | Republican
| rowspan=7 nowrap | Nov 1, 1946 –Jan 3, 1959
| Appointed to finish Austin's term.

|- style="height:2em"
| rowspan=3 | Elected in 1946.
| rowspan=3 | 27
| 

|- style="height:2em"
| 

|- style="height:2em"
| 
| rowspan=3 | 28
| rowspan=3 | Re-elected in 1950.

|- style="height:2em"
| rowspan=3 | Re-elected in 1952.Retired.
| rowspan=3 | 28
| 

|- style="height:2em"
| 

|- style="height:2em"
| 
| rowspan=3 | 29
| rowspan=3 | Re-elected in 1956.

|- style="height:2em"
! rowspan=7 | 19
| rowspan=7 align=left | Winston L. Prouty
| rowspan=7  | Republican
| rowspan=7 nowrap | Jan 3, 1959 –Sep 10, 1971
| rowspan=3 | Elected in 1958.
| rowspan=3 | 29
| 

|- style="height:2em"
| 

|- style="height:2em"
| 
| rowspan=3 | 30
| rowspan=3 | Re-elected in 1962.

|- style="height:2em"
| rowspan=3 | Re-elected in 1964.
| rowspan=3 | 30
| 

|- style="height:2em"
| 

|- style="height:2em"
| 
| rowspan=5 | 31
| rowspan=5 | Re-elected in 1968.Retired.

|- style="height:2em"
| Re-elected in 1970.Died.
| rowspan=5 | 31
| rowspan=3 

|- style="height:2em"
| colspan=3 | Vacant
| nowrap | Sep 10, 1971 –Sep 16, 1971
|  

|- style="height:2em"
! rowspan=9 | 20
| rowspan=9 align=left | Robert Stafford
| rowspan=9  | Republican
| rowspan=9 nowrap | Sep 16, 1971 –Jan 3, 1989
| rowspan=3 | Appointed to continue Prouty's term.Elected in 1972 to finish Prouty's term.

|- style="height:2em"
| 

|- style="height:2em"
| 
| rowspan=3 | 32
| rowspan=3 | Elected in 1974.
| rowspan=25 nowrap | Jan 3, 1975 –Jan 3, 2023
| rowspan=25  | Democratic
| rowspan=25 align=right | Patrick Leahy
! rowspan=25 | 22

|- style="height:2em"
| rowspan=3 | Re-elected in 1976.
| rowspan=3 | 32
| 

|- style="height:2em"
| 

|- style="height:2em"
| 
| rowspan=3 | 33
| rowspan=3 | Re-elected in 1980.

|- style="height:2em"
| rowspan=3 | Re-elected in 1982.Retired.
| rowspan=3 | 33
| 

|- style="height:2em"
| 

|- style="height:2em"
| 
| rowspan=3 | 34
| rowspan=3 | Re-elected in 1986.

|- style="height:2em"
! rowspan=10 | 21
| rowspan=10 align=left | Jim Jeffords
| rowspan=7  | Republican
| rowspan=10 nowrap | Jan 3, 1989 –Jan 3, 2007
| rowspan=3 | Elected in 1988.
| rowspan=3 | 34
| 

|- style="height:2em"
| 

|- style="height:2em"
| 
| rowspan=3 | 35
| rowspan=3 | Re-elected in 1992.

|- style="height:2em"
| rowspan=3 | Re-elected in 1994.
| rowspan=3 | 35
| 

|- style="height:2em"
| 

|- style="height:2em"
| 
| rowspan=4 | 36
| rowspan=4 | Re-elected in 1998.

|- style="height:3em"
| rowspan=4 | Re-elected in 2000.Changed parties Jun 6, 2001.Retired.
| rowspan=4 | 36
| rowspan=2 

|- style="height:2em"
| rowspan=3  | Independent

|- style="height:2em"
| 

|- style="height:2em"
| 
| rowspan=3 | 37
| rowspan=3 | Re-elected in 2004.

|- style="height:2em"
! rowspan=9 | 22
| rowspan=9 align=left | Bernie Sanders
| rowspan=9  | Independent
| rowspan=9 nowrap | Jan 3, 2007 –Present
| rowspan=3 | Elected in 2006.
| rowspan=3 | 37
| 

|- style="height:2em"
| 

|- style="height:2em"
| 
| rowspan=3 | 38
| rowspan=3 | Re-elected in 2010.

|- style="height:2em"
| rowspan=3 | Re-elected in 2012.
| rowspan=3 | 38
| 

|- style="height:2em"
| 

|- style="height:2em"
| 
| rowspan=3 | 39
| rowspan=3 | Re-elected in 2016. Retired.

|- style="height:2em"
| rowspan=3 | Re-elected in 2018.
| rowspan=3 | 39
| 

|- style="height:2em"
| 

|- style="height:2em"
| 
| rowspan=3| 40
| rowspan=3 | Elected in 2022.
| rowspan=3 | Jan 3, 2023 – Present
| rowspan=3  | Democratic
| rowspan=3 align=right | Peter Welch
! rowspan=3 | 23

|- style="height:2em"
| rowspan=3 colspan=5 |  To be determined in the 2024 election.
| rowspan=3| 40
| 

|- style="height:2em"
| 

|- style="height:2em"
| 
| 41
| colspan=5 | To be determined in the 2028 election.

See also

 List of United States representatives from Vermont
 United States congressional delegations from Vermont
 Elections in Vermont

Notes

References

Sources 
 

 

 
United States Senators
Vermont